Puerto Rico competed at the 2022 Winter Paralympics in Beijing, China which took place between 4–13 March 2022. It was the first time Puerto Rico competed at the Winter Paralympics. One alpine skier competed.

Competitors
The following is the list of number of competitors participating at the Games per sport/discipline.

Alpine skiing

Orlando Perez competed in alpine skiing.

See also
Puerto Rico at the Paralympics
Puerto Rico at the 2022 Winter Olympics

References

Nations at the 2022 Winter Paralympics
2022
Winter Paralympics